The Provisional Government of National Union and National Salvation of Cambodia (PGNUNSC) was an internationally unrecognised and ostensibly provisional government set up by the Khmer Rouge on July 11, 1994, in opposition to the established Kingdom of Cambodia.

History
PGNUNSC's Prime Minister was Khieu Samphan (who was also head of the armed forces) and its Deputy Prime Minister (in charge also of foreign affairs) was Son Sen. It was staffed by members of the Cambodian National Unity Party. Areas it controlled included Pailin (the capital of the provisional government) and Preah Vihear (where it was based.) The Khmer Rouge radio station was also known as the "Radio of the Provisional Government of National Union and National Salvation of Cambodia." Other ministers included Chan Youran, Mak Ben, In Sopheap, Kor Bun Heng, Pich Cheang and Chuon Choeun.

In August 1996 senior Khmer Rouge official Ieng Sary defected from the KR with two armed divisions and the formation of his own party, the Democratic National Union Movement, which in turn encouraged more defections from the KR as Pol Pot ordered the assassinations of Son Sen (which was successful) and Ta Mok (which was not.) In mid-June 1997 Khieu Samphan (who had by now founded the Khmer National Solidarity Party) denounced Pol Pot and began discussing demobilization and a return to civilian life.

With Pol Pot's death in April 1998 and widespread sentiment within the Khmer Rouge for an end to an almost 20-year conflict, Khieu Samphan and Ta Mok dissolved the provisional government on June 22, 1998.

References

Cambodia
Khmer Rouge
1994 establishments in Cambodia
1998 disestablishments in Cambodia
Cambodia
Cambodia
Cambodia